Ryan King (born 6 March 1979) is a Zimbabwean cricketer. He played sixteen first-class matches between 1998 and 2003.

See also
 CFX Academy cricket team

References

External links
 

1979 births
Living people
Zimbabwean cricketers
CFX Academy cricketers
Matabeleland cricketers
Sportspeople from Kwekwe